Robert Alexander Tamplin Miller (12 November 1895 – 10 July 1941) was an English cricketer active in 1919 who played for Sussex. He was born in Travancore and died in Yemen. He appeared in twelve first-class matches as a righthanded batsman who kept wicket. He scored 191 runs with a highest score of 39 and completed nine catches with 11 stumpings.

Notes

1895 births
1941 deaths
English cricketers
Sussex cricketers
British Army personnel killed in World War II
British Army General List officers
Wicket-keepers
British Army officers